R. Gnanadoss is an Indian politician and presently serving Member of the Legislative Assembly. He was elected to the Tamil Nadu legislative assembly as a Marumalarchi Dravida Munnetra Kazhagam candidate from Sivakasi constituency in 2006.

References 

Tamil Nadu politicians
Living people
Marumalarchi Dravida Munnetra Kazhagam politicians
Year of birth missing (living people)